Bafq (also Romanized as Bāfq) is a city in the Central District of Bafq County, Yazd province, Iran, and serves as capital of the county. At the 2006 census, its population was 30,867 in 7,919 households. The following census in 2011 counted 33,882 people in 9,895 households. The latest census in 2016 showed a population of 45,453 people in 13,454 households.

References 

Bafq County

Cities in Yazd Province

Populated places in Yazd Province

Populated places in Bafq County